Animalist was one of the networks under Discovery Digital Networks based upon animal-themed video content. Launched in Fall of 2013, Animalist, along with Revision3, TestTube, and the Defranco Network make-up the web-original video arm for Discovery Communications. The channel is also famous for previously owning "Brave Wilderness" YouTube Channel hosted by Coyote Peterson that later became independent of the network.

Shows 

Animalist News
Animal Takedowns with Tay Zonday
Animals With Low Self Esteem
Before it Was Cool With Hamilton The Hipster Cat
Big Cat Rescue
Cat Mojo with Jackson Galaxy
Cole & Marmalade
Discovery World Safari
Furrocious with Mike Falzone
Lil BUB's Big Show
Petsami
Pudge It Yourself
Truther Cats
Weird, Gross and Beautiful with Catie Wayne

Past Shows
 "Brave Wilderness" - became independent, now owned by Wilderness Production LLC

References

External links 

Discovery Channel